Georg Hermann Meyer (born 24 December 1868, date of death unknown) was a German sport shooter who competed on the German team in the 1912 Summer Olympics that finished seventh in the 30 metre team military pistol competition. In the 30 metre rapid fire pistol event he finished 39th.

References

Sources

External links
List of German sport shooters

1868 births
Year of death missing
German male sport shooters
ISSF pistol shooters
Olympic shooters of Germany
Shooters at the 1912 Summer Olympics
Sportspeople from Hanover